The 2015 South African Athletics Championships was the year's edition of the national championship in outdoor track and field for South Africa. It was held on 17–18 April at the Coetzenburg Stadium in Stellenbosch. It served as the selection meeting for South Africa at the 2015 World Championships in Athletics.

Results

Men

Women

References
 saseniors.co.za (Full Results)

External links
 Official website of the (ASA; Athletics South Africa)

2015
South African Athletics Championships
South African Athletics Championships
Sport in the Western Cape